Brefeldin A-inhibited guanine nucleotide-exchange protein 1 is a protein that in humans is encoded by the ARFGEF1 gene.

Function 

ADP-ribosylation factors (ARFs) play an important role in intracellular vesicular trafficking. The protein encoded by this gene is involved in the activation of ARFs by accelerating replacement of bound GDP with GTP. It contains a Sec7 domain, which may be responsible for the guanine-nucleotide exchange activity and also the brefeldin A inhibition.

Interactions 

ARFGEF1 has been shown to interact with FKBP2, ARFGEF2 and PRKAR1A.

References

External links

Further reading